Əmirtürbə (also, Amirturba) is a village in the Masally Rayon of Azerbaijan.  The village forms part of the municipality of Güllütəpə.

References 

Populated places in Masally District